Netra News is a Sweden-based investigative and public interest journalism platform focusing on Bangladesh. The platform was launched on Dec. 26, 2019, by Tasneem Khalil, an exiled Bangladeshi journalist currently living in Sweden, who acts as its editor-in chief.

Within 72 hours of its inception, the website was blocked by authorities in Bangladesh, with Khalil himself alleging and media reports suggesting that Bangladesh's military intelligence agency, Directorate General of Forces Intelligence (DGFI), orchestrated the ban. On August 14, 2022, Netra news came into international prominence for a whistleblower report alleging that Bangladesh officials were holding and torturing victims of enforced disappearances at Aynaghar(house of mirrors), a secret detention facility in Bangladesh.

History 
Netra News is run by a grant provided by National Endowment for Democracy, a non-governmental and non-profit organization funded by the U.S. government.

It is a project under Bangladesh Media Network, which is overseen by a board comprising Kerstin Brunnberg (president), a prominent Swedish journalist, Bangladeshi-Australian academic Bina D’Costa (secretary), and Dan Morrison (treasurer), an American journalist.

Published in both English and Bangla, the platform was co-founded by David Bergman, a journalist who has extensively worked in Bangladesh, who works as the editor of its English version. Israt Jahan, a Bangladeshi journalist based in Sweden, has joined the news organization on Nov. 1, 2020 as the editor of its Bangla edition.

The website, in its opening editorial, stated that it decided not to name any other journalists associated with it, citing “security concerns.”

Website block 
As one of its first reports, the website ran a story alleging that Obaidul Quader, the general secretary of the ruling Awami League party and a cabinet minister, had a collection of luxury watches from brands including Rolex, Louis Vuitton, and Ulysse Nardin, the price of which was not consistent with his publicly disclosed income. The website was blocked days after the story had been published.

In the wake of the ban, the website launched a mirror version based in Google Cloud Firebase Storage, which was also blocked by authorities only to be forced to lift the ban following complaints from app developers who relied on the Google service.

However, the mirror site was blocked again following the publication of a report based on a leaked United Nations memo forecasting up to 2 million deaths in Bangladesh in the COVID-19 crisis in a "no-intervention" scenario. The website of Benar News, a Malaysia-based news agency, was also blocked in Bangladesh following its publication of the story quoting Netra News.

Response 
The Obaidul Quader exposé triggered a call for investigations from Transparency International Bangladesh, an anti-graft watchdog. The minister subsequently claimed that he had received the watches as gifts.

In January 2020, Netra News published a report accusing Tabith Awal, a candidate of the opposition Bangladesh Nationalist Party in Dhaka mayoral elections, of failing to "disclose ownership of a foreign company in his affidavit to the Election Commission of Bangladesh." Following the publication of the report, AHM Shamsuddin Chowdhury Manik, a former justice of Supreme Court of Bangladesh, filed a petition to the high court challenging Awal’s candidacy. However, the high court rejected the petition and allowed Awal to contest in the election.

On March 21, 2020, Netra News published a leaked preliminary research report prepared by a group of Bangladeshi and U.S.-based researchers led by Malay Kanti Mridha of BRAC University predicting that Bangladesh faced up to 500,000 deaths in the COVID-19 crisis without any government interventions. The story led the university to launch an internal investigation against Mridha, a move that was condemned by academic freedom activists. The website also subsequently accused the university of “[attempting] to restrict access” to the report by forcing document hosting website Scribd to remove it on copyright grounds from the latter’s website despite having previously claimed that it had not authorized the report.

On March 28, 2020, the platform leaked a United Nations interagency memo, which predicted up to 2 million deaths in Bangladesh from Covid-19 in a “no-intervention” scenario. Bangladesh’s foreign minister, AK Abdul Momen, criticized the leak of the memo, calling it “a total violation of the UN charter.” The story, however, was widely picked up by global media outlets including The Atlantic, South China Morning Post, and The Australian.

Netra News in May 2020 published an investigative story alleging that Bangladesh’s military intelligence hired and employed hackers and online trolls to go against dissenting activists on Facebook. The report was cited by Freedom House in the Bangladesh chapter of its Freedom on the Net 2020 report. In December 2020, Facebook announced that it took actions against a Bangladeshi hacker group.

In 2022, Netra News exposed how Rapid Action Battalion's intelligence wing abducted Ilias Ali. The report claimed that the close associates of Ziaul Ahsan was responsible for the enforced disappearance of the former lawmaker.

Harassment 
The mother of Tasneem Khalil, the chief editor, has allegedly faced harassment at the hand of state agencies.

In October 2020, Human Rights Watch, Amnesty International, Robert F. Kennedy Human Rights and Asian Human Rights Commission cited in their reports allegations made by Khalil that security officials visited his mother Nazneen Khalil’s residence in Sylhet to question her about his activities. They also allegedly made threats saying that if they decide to visit her home again, their approach may be “different and not nice.”

In a separate incident, the anti-terrorism unit of the Bangladesh police in June 2021 charged Khalil, among others, for “spreading rumours and carrying out anti-government activities.”

References 

Swedish news websites
2019 establishments in Sweden